Cannon for Cordoba is a 1970 American Western film. Filmed in Spain, the larger part of the movie takes place in Mexico in 1912. Directed by Paul Wendkos, it stars George Peppard, Pete Duel, Giovanna Ralli, and Raf Vallone, and features a musical score by Elmer Bernstein.

Plot
It is 1912 and groups of Mexican revolutionaries have been attacking towns on both sides of the Mexican–American border. The most powerful of these groups is led by a former Mexican army general, Héctor Cordoba. When a surprise attack results in six cannons falling into the hands of Cordoba and his men, the United States government puts General John J. "Blackjack" Pershing in charge of seeing that the cannons will never be used against the American people. Pershing turns to Captain Rod Douglas, instructing him to gather a group of men to take part in the dangerous mission into the heart of the Cordoba's territory.

The first man to sign up for the job is Jackson Harkness, a soldier who has worked with Douglas before. At the beginning of the film, Harkness has to stand by and watch as his brother is tortured and killed by Cordoba. Douglas ordered him not to step in because they were undercover as sympathizers in the enemy camp and could not afford to make their true intentions known. As a result, Harkness vows vengeance on the captain and will not leave his side until the opportunity presents itself.

The next two men that Douglas chooses for the operation are Andy Rice, and Peter, who have just broken out of the army jail when Douglas arrives with the orders for their release. The captain now has all of the men that he feels are necessary for getting the job done. However, a Mexican lieutenant, Antonio Gutierrez, who holds a personal grudge against Cordoba, approaches him and demands to be part of the operation. He tells Douglas that he knows a woman, Leonora Cristobal, who, for her own reasons, wishes to see Cordoba dead. If the captain includes him in the mission, she will help them by working her way into Cordoba's confidence and getting him alone so that he will be vulnerable when they make their move.

Antonio and Leonora arrive at Cordoba's camp first. Leonora, who learns that the Mexican government wants to capture Cordoba alive, betrays Antonio and informs the bandit leader of his intentions, hoping that he will reward her for what she has done by allowing her to get closer to him, giving her the opportunity to kill him herself.

When Douglas, Andy, Peter, and Harkness arrive at the camp, posing as sympathizers, they hear of what Leonora has done and decide that they have to act quickly. Douglas starts a fight with one of the Mexican men, so as to be put in jail, where he can help Antonio to escape. That night, Andy, disguised as a Mexican guard, breaks both of the men out of jail so that the operation can proceed. Douglas goes to Cordoba's room, where he finds him alone with Leonora. She betrayed Antonio but she still did the job she was supposed to do. Meanwhile, Jackson and Peter turn the cannons on the camp and begin to fire, while Andy and Antonio shoot flares into the buildings. Chaos ensues and the group of men, along with Leonora and their prisoner, Cordoba, attempt to ride out of the camp. Peter, Antonio, and Andy are killed in the process, and Cordoba is wounded.

The next morning, miles away from the camp, the diminished group stops to rest. When Douglas goes off by himself, Harkness sees his opportunity to avenge his brother. He follows the captain, demands that he turn around, and draws his gun. As Douglas walks unflinchingly toward him, however, he is unable to shoot and, instead, punches him. All now forgiven, the two men walk back to where Leonora waits. Cordoba has died from the wound he received the previous night. They are not able to bring him back alive, as the government had wanted, but the cannons were destroyed and their mission is complete.

Cast

Reception
Arthur Krim of United Artists later did an assessment of the film as part of an evaluation of the company's inventory:

In 1970 there was a marked change in global acceptance of western and adventure film. The results of films of other companies - for instance Mackenna's Gold, Murphy's War, The Last Valley - as well as our own - Play Dirty, The Bridge at Remagen - indicated a need for substantial downward revisions in assessing proper budget costs for pictures in this category - even with the so-called big name action stars. This picture falls in that category. If programmed today, it would be considered acceptable only if it could be made at half cost.

See also
 List of American films of 1970

References

External links 
 
 
 Cannon for Cordoba at Turner Classic Movies

1970 films
1970s English-language films
1970 Western (genre) films
American Western (genre) films
Mexican Revolution films
Films scored by Elmer Bernstein
Films directed by Paul Wendkos
United Artists films
Films set in Mexico
Films set in 1912
Films shot in Almería
1970s American films